The Dwarf Stars Award is an annual award presented by the Science Fiction Poetry Association to the author of the best horror, fantasy, or science fiction poem of ten lines or fewer published in the previous year. The award was established in 2006 as a counterpoint to the Rhysling Award, which is given by the same organization to horror, fantasy, or science fiction poems of any length. Poems are submitted to the association by the poets, from which approximately 30 are chosen by an editor to be published in an anthology each fall. Members of the association then vote on the published poems, and first through third-place winners are announced. The 2006 anthology was edited by Deborah P. Kolodji, and subsequent anthologies have been edited by an array of editors, including Kolodji, Stephen M. Wilson, Joshua Gage, Geoffrey A. Landis, Linda D. Addison, Sandra J. Lindow, John Amen, Jeannine Hall Gailey, and Lesley Wheeler.

During the 16 nomination years, 51 poems by 37 poets have been selected as third place or better, including one three-way tie for second place in 2016 and one two-way tie for third place in 2018, of which 15 poets have won outright. Jane Yolen has been noted four times, a first and a third place and two second-place results; Kolodji, Julie Bloss Kelsey and LeRoy Gorman have each received a first and a second place; Greg Beatty a first and a third place; Sonya Taaffe has received two second-place results; Sandi Leibowitz has received a second and a third-place result; and Ann K. Schwader and Sandra J. Lindow have each received two third-place results.

Winners and nominees
In the following table, the years correspond to the date in which the award was given, rather than when the poem was first published. Each year links to the corresponding "year in poetry". Entries with a blue background and an asterisk (*) next to the writer's name have won the award, while those with a gray background and a plus sign (+) took second place, and those with a white background took third.

References

External links
 

Fantasy awards
Poetry awards
Science fiction awards